Harry Ronald Wells (born 29 September 1993) is an English rugby union player for Leicester Tigers in Premiership Rugby, the top division of rugby union. His primary positions are lock and flanker.  He has also played for Nottingham and Bedford Blues in the RFU Championship, England's second division.  He has won one cap for the  national team. He was a Premiership Rugby champion in 2022.

Career

Leicester debut and Bedford
Wells made his debut for Leicester aged 19 in 2013 during an LV Cup game against Wasps at Welford Road.

He joined Bedford Blues in 2014 initially on loan before making the move permanent that summer.  Wells established himself in the side at lock playing more than 50 games across two and a half seasons. He featured for the side in the last Championship playoffs, after helping the side reach the top 4.

Rejoins Leicester
In the summer of 2016 he re-joined Tigers as a member of the first team squad.  He made his  Premiership debut against Bristol in November 2016, he then made his first Premiership start in February 2017 against Harlequins. Wells played as a replacement in the 2022 Premiership Rugby final as Tigers beat Saracens 15-12.

International career

Wells was initially named as a member of the  36 man summer training squad on 10 June 2021.

References

1993 births
Living people
Bedford Blues players
England international rugby union players
English rugby union players
Leicester Tigers players
Nottingham R.F.C. players
Rugby union locks
Rugby union players from Peterborough